The Bristol Hippodrome is a theatre located in The Centre, Bristol, England,  United Kingdom with seating on three levels giving a capacity of 1,951. It frequently features shows from London's West End when they tour the UK, as well as regular visits by Welsh National Opera and an annual pantomime.

History 
The theatre was designed by Frank Matcham for Oswald Stoll, and opened on 16 December 1912. It has been designated by English Heritage as a grade II listed building. An important feature of the theatre when it opened was a huge water tank at the front of the stage, which could be filled with 100,000 gallons (450,000 litres) of water. Along with the tank was a large protective glass screen which could be raised in order to protect the orchestra and those in the stalls. It also has a dome, which can be opened when necessary; however since air conditioning has been installed it is rarely opened.

The theatre survived World War II, but less than three years after it ended, a fire destroyed the stage, though not the auditorium. The theatre reopened about 10 months later.

American musician Eddie Cochran played his final show here, in 1960, and was killed in a road accident only hours later, in Chippenham, Wiltshire.

The theatre plays host to many top shows, such as Miss Saigon, Cats, Les Misérables, Blood Brothers and Of Mice and Men. This is due to the size of its stage, which is one of the largest outside London. In addition to large musicals it is also a venue for comedians such as Russell Howard, Frankie Boyle, Ricky Tomlinson and Lee Mack, as well as children's shows such as Winnie the Pooh Live. The Bristol Hippodrome has strong links with many shows that frequently appear there, such as the Welsh National Opera.

In 2012, the theatre celebrated its centenary with a show called Thanks for the Memories, staged by amateur groups Bristol Light Opera Club and Bristol Musical Youth Productions.

Premieres 
The theatre has staged a number of premieres including:
 British premiere of Guys and Dolls starring Vivian Blaine as Miss Adelaide and Sam Levene as Nathan Detroit, reprising their original Broadway performances; the musical opened May 19, 1953 for an eight performance run before opening at the London Coliseum May 28, 1953 and running for 555 performances.  
 European premiere The Music Man in 1961
 European premiere of Sail Away in 1962
 British premiere of Jeeves in 1975
 World premiere of Windy City in 1982
 World premiere of The Nutcracker by the English National Ballet in 2002
 World premiere of Mary Poppins  in 2004

Gallery

References

Further reading

External links 

 Theatre site
 Bristol theatre archive at the University of Bristol Theatre Collection, University of Bristol
 Arthur Lloyd Music Hall and Theatre History Website
 Bristol Hippodrome

Theatres in Bristol
Culture in Bristol
Grade II listed buildings in Bristol
Theatres completed in 1912
Music venues in Bristol
1912 establishments in England